India participated in the 2009 Asian Indoor Games held in Hanoi, Vietnam from October 28 to November 8.

Medalists

References

 Official site

Nations at the 2009 Asian Indoor Games
Asian Indoor Games
India at the Asian Indoor Games